Follow the Money is a Danish television financial crime thriller. The first series of ten episodes is set in the renewable energy business in Denmark. It was broadcast in Denmark in January 2016. The second series was broadcast in October–November 2016, continuing with most of the characters from the first series, but with the main focus on a bank practising P2P lending and their attempted takeover by a bank whose chair, Knud Christensen, was behind the fraud case investigated in the first season. The third series, again ten episodes, was aired in January 2019. It focuses on money laundering with two of the main characters from the previous two series.

Main cast

Broadcast 
The first series, which has dialogue in Danish, Swedish and English, was broadcast subtitled in the UK on BBC Four from March 2016 under the title Follow the Money with two episodes being shown back-to-back. In Finland, the first episode was broadcast on 12 April 2016 on Yle Fem, subtitled in Swedish and Finnish. In The Netherlands, the first episode was broadcast on 7 March 2016, under the title Follow the Money, subtitled in Dutch. In Belgium, Canvas has broadcast the series under the title Follow the Money with Dutch subtitles between 12 March 2016 and 9 April 2016. It premiered in Canada on CBC on 18 June 2016. It has also been shown on SBS in Australia, concluding in June 2016. It was shown in Portugal on RTP2 on 7 December 2016. In Slovenia it was broadcast on Radiotelevizija Slovenija from 15 May 2017 with Slovene subtitles.

In the UK, series 2 broadcast began on 4 March 2017 on BBC Four with two episodes being shown back-to-back.

In Denmark, series 3 broadcast began on 6 January 2019 on DR1; in Finland from 10 March 2019 on Yle Teema & Fem and in the UK from 6 April 2019 on BBC Four with two episodes being shown back-to-back. In Portugal, it was broadcast from 3 September 2019 on RTP2.

Reception 

Reviewers from several major Danish newspapers were critical of the second season. The series' cast and technical aspects such as photography were praised, while the story and the development of the characters were criticized. Berlingske, Ekstra Bladet, Politiken and Jyllands-Posten awarded the second season three stars, while BT awarded it four stars.

Awards

References

External links

The Killing Times TV

2010s Danish television series
DR television dramas
Danish drama television series
Danish crime television series
Television shows set in Denmark
Thriller television series